Francesco Foschi (1716 – 21 February 1780) was an Italian painter best known for painting winter landscapes.

Biography
He was born in Ancona in the Marche. He moved to Rome in 1729 and encountered the works of other painters of veduta.  He died in Rome. He should not be confused with the 16th century Florentine portrait artist, Pier Francesco Foschi. His surname has also been written as Toschi

Francesco had four brothers that were also painters: Carlo, Giacomo, Orazio., and Lorenzo.

Sources
 Grassi Studio abstract

Gallery

1710 births
1780 deaths
People from Ancona
18th-century Italian painters
Italian male painters
Italian vedutisti
Italian landscape painters
18th-century Italian male artists